Sergei Karimov (German:Sergej Karimow, Russian: Сергей Каримов; 21 December 1986 – 24 December 2019) was a Kazakh professional footballer who played as a left back.

Personal life 
Karimov was of German descent on his mother's side and Russian on his father's side. He was born in the present-day city of Saran, Kazakhstan, but grew up in Wolfsburg.

He died on 24 December 2019 at the age of 33.

Club career
In the 2005–06 season, Karimov began playing for the VfL Wolfsburg reserve side, which played in Oberliga Nord. The following season, he had appeared for the side on 19 occasions, now playing in Regionalliga Nord, before manager Bernd Hollerbach recommended him to Felix Magath's senior team.

On 8 December 2007, Karimov made his first Bundesliga appearance against VfB Stuttgart. On 30 January 2008, he played in a German Cup round of 16 match against Schalke 04. He scored a 90th-minute equaliser, before scoring the decider in the penalty shootout. Karimov subsequently signed a professional contract with Wolfsburg until 2010 and was put to the reserve team in summer 2009.

International career
In February 2008, the Football Federation of Kazakhstan made an official invitation to Karimov to play for the national team. The player's final decision was to be made in the summer, after the season's finish. On 11 August 2010, Karimov made his first appearance in a 3–1 victory over Oman.

References

External links
 

1986 births
2019 deaths
Association football defenders
Kazakhstani footballers
Kazakhstan international footballers
Kazakhstani people of German descent
Kazakhstani people of Russian descent
Citizens of Germany through descent
German footballers
German people of Russian descent
VfL Wolfsburg II players
VfL Wolfsburg players
MSV Duisburg players
Lupo Martini Wolfsburg players
Bundesliga players
2. Bundesliga players
Regionalliga players